The northern sooty woodpecker (Mulleripicus funebris) is a species of bird in the family Picidae.
It is endemic to Luzon, Marinduque, Catanduanes and the Polillo Islands in the Philippines.

Its natural habitats are subtropical or tropical moist lowland forests and subtropical or tropical moist montane forests.

The northern sooty woodpecker was once considered conspecific with the southern sooty woodpecker and both were lumped together as Mulleripicus funebris and known simply as the "sooty woodpecker".

References

northern sooty woodpecker
Endemic birds of the Philippines
Birds of Luzon
Fauna of Marinduque
Fauna of Catanduanes
northern sooty woodpecker
Taxonomy articles created by Polbot